Beijing Capital International Airport  is one of two international airports serving Beijing, the other one being Beijing Daxing International Airport (PKX). The airport is owned and operated by the Beijing Capital International Airport Company Limited, a state-controlled company. The airport's IATA Airport code, PEK, is based on the city's former romanized name, Peking.

Beijing Capital has rapidly ascended in rankings of the world's busiest airports in the past decade. It had become the busiest airport in Asia in terms of passenger traffic and total traffic movements by 2009. It was the world's second busiest airport in terms of passenger traffic between 2010 and 2021. The airport registered 557,167 aircraft movements (takeoffs and landings), ranking 6th in the world in 2012. In terms of cargo traffic, Beijing airport has also witnessed rapid growth. By 2012, the airport had become the 13th busiest airport in the world by cargo traffic, registering 1,787,027 tons.

History

Beijing Airport was opened on 1 March 1958. Another 3,200-meter runway on the west was completed in October 1978. On 1 January 1980, a newer, larger Terminal 1 – green in color – opened, with docks for 10 to 12 aircraft. The terminal was larger than the one built in the 1950s, but by the mid-1990s, its size became relatively inadequate.

The first International flight to China and Beijing Capital International Airport was of Pakistan International Airlines from Islamabad.

In late 1999, to mark the 50th anniversary of the founding of the PRC, the airport experienced a new round of expansion as Terminal 2 opened on 1 November of that year. Terminal 1 was then temporarily closed for renovation after the opening of Terminal 2. 20 September 2004 saw the opening of a renovated Terminal 1, which at that time solely handled China Southern Airlines' domestic and international flights from Beijing. Other airlines' domestic and international flights still operated in Terminal 2.

Another round of expansion started in 2007. A third runway opened on 29 October 2007, to relieve congestion on the other two runways. Terminal 3 (T3) was completed in February 2008, in time for the Beijing Olympics. This colossal expansion also included a rail link to the city center. At its opening, the new Terminal 3 was the largest man-made structure in the world in terms of area covered, and a major landmark representing Beijing as the growing and developing Chinese capital. The expansion was largely funded by a 30 billion yen loan from Japan and a 500-million-euro (US$625 million) loan from the European Investment Bank (EIB). The loan is the largest ever granted by the EIB in Asia; the agreement was signed during the eighth China-EU Summit held in September 2005.

Fresh from hosting the 2008 Summer Olympics and adding its new terminal building, Beijing Capital has overtaken Tokyo Haneda to be the busiest airport in Asia based on scheduled seat capacity.

Due to limited capacity at Beijing Capital International Airport, plans were set forth for the construction of a new airport in Daxing. The project was given final approval on 13 January 2013. Construction began in late 2014 and was completed in 2019. The new airport will serve as a hub for SkyTeam alliance airlines (except China Eastern Airlines), while Star Alliance members will stay at Beijing Capital International Airport. Hainan Airlines, which accounted for 10% of Beijing Capital International's passenger seat capacity in 2016, but is not part of any major alliance, will stay at the existing capital airport.

Terminals

Shuttle buses connect the airport's three terminals. Terminal 1 serves the domestic routes of Hainan Airlines and its subsidiaries (while its international, Hong Kong, Macau, and Taiwan flights operate from Terminal 2). Terminal 2 serves SkyTeam with the exception of China Airlines, Oneworld member SriLankan Airlines, and also other domestic and international flights. Terminal 3, the newest terminal, serves Air China, Star Alliance, Oneworld members with the exception of SriLankan Airlines, plus SkyTeam member China Airlines, and some other domestic and international flights that do not operate from either Terminals 1 or 2.

Terminal 1 (HNA Exclusive Domestic Terminal)

Terminal 1 was closed for renovation from 1 November 1999 to 20 September 2004, during which all airlines operated from Terminal 2. Featuring 16 gates, it was the operational base for the domestic routes of China Southern Airlines and a few other airlines such as XiamenAir and Chongqing Airlines, and was originally planned to handle domestic traffic excluding those to Hong Kong and Macau.

With the opening of Terminal 3, the terminal was closed for light refurbishment, and its airlines were moved to Terminal 2 on 20 May 2008. Terminal 1 reopened for a second time on 27 June 2008, and became the operational base for all domestic flights operated by the HNA Group including those of Hainan Airlines, Grand China Air and Tianjin Airlines, while all HNA Group's international, Hong Kong, Macau, and Taiwan flights remain in Terminal 2.

Terminal 2

This terminal was used to replace Terminal 1 while the latter was undergoing renovation, cramping all airlines despite being far bigger than Terminal 1. It can handle twenty aircraft at docks connecting directly to the terminal building. Prior to the opening of Terminal 3, all international flights (and the majority of domestic flights) operated from this terminal. This terminal now houses Hainan Airlines (all international, Hong Kong, Macau, and Taiwan flights), SkyTeam with the exception of China Airlines, which uses Terminal 3, Oneworld member SriLankan Airlines, Air Koryo, and other domestic and international flights other than those operated by Shanghai Airlines, Star Alliance members and Oneworld members. A gate capable of handling the A380 (gate 21) was also built at the terminal. Star Alliance member Air China also uses Terminal 2 for some of its domestic flights.

Terminals 1 and 2 are linked by a public walkway that takes about 10–15 minutes to traverse.

Terminal 3

Construction of Terminal 3 started on 28 March 2004, and the terminal opened in two stages. Trial operations commenced on 29 February 2008, when seven airlines including El Al, Qantas, Qatar Airways, Shandong Airlines and Sichuan Airlines moved into the terminal. Twenty other airlines followed when the terminal became fully operational on 26 March 2008. Currently, it mainly houses Air China, Star Alliance,  Oneworld with the exception of  SriLankan Airlines, which uses Terminal 2, SkyTeam member China Airlines, and other domestic and international flights that are not operated from Terminal 2. Star Alliance members LOT Polish Airlines, Scandinavian Airlines, Lufthansa, Austrian Airlines, United Airlines, Air Canada, Turkish Airlines, Thai Airways International, Singapore Airlines, All Nippon Airways, Asiana Airlines, and Air China use Terminal 3-E as part of the Move Under One Roof program to co-locate alliance members.

Terminal 3 was designed by a consortium of Netherlands Airport Consultants (NACO), Foster and Partners, Arup and the Beijing Institute of Architectural Design (BIAD). Lighting was designed by UK lighting architects Speirs and Major Associates. The budget for the expansion is US$3.5 billion. It features a main passenger terminal (Terminal 3C) and two satellite concourses (Terminal 3D and Terminal 3E), all of the five floors above ground and two underground, with the letters "A and B" omitted to avoid confusion with the existing Terminals 1 and 2. Only two concourses were initially opened, namely, Terminal 3C dedicated for domestic flights and Terminal 3E for international flights. Terminal 3D officially opened on 18 April 2013. The newly opened concourse is temporarily used solely by Air China for some of its domestic flights.

At the time of its opening, Terminal 3 was the largest airport passenger terminal building in the world. Its title as the world's largest passenger terminal was surrendered on 14 October 2008 to Dubai International Airport's Terminal 3, which has  of floor space.

On 20 July 2013, a man in a wheelchair detonated small homemade explosives in Terminal 3 of the Beijing International Airport. The bomber, reported to be Ji Zhongxing, was injured and taken to a hospital for his injuries. No other people were hurt.

System, security and luggage

Terminal 3 has a  transportation hub with a 7,000-car garage. The transportation center has designated traffic lanes for airport buses, taxis, and private vehicles. Travelers bound for T3 can exit their vehicles and enter T3 within five minutes. There is also a station for the Capital Airport Express of the Beijing Subway.

Terminal 3 has 243 elevators, escalators or moving walkways. Each row of seats in the waiting area has electrical outlets. Every restroom has a diaper changing station. There is also a room for travelers with disabilities.

One of Terminal 3's highlights is the US$240 million luggage-transfer systems. The luggage system is equipped with yellow carts, each of which has a code that matches the bar code on every piece of luggage loaded and allows easy and accurate tracking. More than 200 cameras are used to monitor activities in the luggage area.

The luggage system can handle 19,200 pieces of luggage per hour. After luggage is checked in at any of the 292 counters in Terminal 3C, it can be transferred at a speed of ten meters per second. Hence, a suitcase can travel from T3C to T3E in five minutes. Arriving passengers should be able to begin retrieving their luggage within 4.5 minutes after airplanes are unloaded.

Besides X-ray scanners, additional equipment is used to conduct baggage screening. Passengers will be able to check-in their luggage at the airport from several hours to even a day before their flights. The airport will store the luggage in its luggage system and then load it on the correct aircraft.

Appearance
The highest building at the airport, a  monitoring tower, stands at the southern end of T3. The roof of T3 is red, the Chinese color for good luck. The terminal's ceilings use white strips for decoration and to indicate directions. Under the white strips, the basic color of the ceiling is orange with light to dark tones indicating where a passenger is inside the building. The roof is light orange in the center. The color deepens as the roof extends to the sides in T3E and goes the other way round in T3C.

The roof of T3 has dozens of triangular windows to let in the daylight. Light angles can be adjusted to ensure adequate interior lighting. Many traditional Chinese elements will be employed in the terminal's interior decoration, including a "Menhai", a big copper vat used to store water for fighting fires in the Forbidden City, and the carvings imitating the famous Nine-Dragon Wall.

An indoor garden in the T3E waiting area is built in the style of imperial gardens such as the Summer Palace. In T3C, a tunnel landscape of an underground garden has been finished with plants on each side so that passengers can appreciate them inside the mini-train.

Facilities
The T3 food-service area is called a "global kitchen," where 72 stores provide food ranging from formal dishes to fast food, from Chinese to western, and from bakery goods to ice cream. Airport officials have promised that people who buy products at the airport will find the same prices in central Beijing.

In addition to food and beverage areas, there is a  domestic retail area, a  duty-free-store area and a nearly  convenience-service area, which includes banks, business centers, Internet services and more. At , the commercial area is twice the size of Beijing's Lufthansa Shopping Center.

The terminal provides 72 aerobridges or jetways and is further complemented with remote parking bays that bring the total number of gates to 150. Terminal 3 comes with an additional runway. It increases BCIA's total capacity by 72 million passengers per year to approximately 90 million.

Airbus A380
The terminal has gates and a nearby runway that can handle the Airbus A380. This capability was proven when Singapore Airlines briefly offered A380 flights to Beijing in August 2008 during the Summer Olympics. Emirates started its scheduled daily operation to Dubai on 1 August 2010. Singapore Airlines has been using an A380 since June 2014 and increased to two A380s in 2015. China Southern Airlines operated two flights to Guangzhou Baiyun Airport, Chongqing Jiangbei Airport, and Amsterdam Schiphol Airport starting from 2011, 2013, and 2015. Lufthansa has been using these facilities since October 2010 to handle up to five A380 flights per week.

Airlines and destinations
International and Hong Kong, Macau or Taiwan flights may resume, begin, suspend, terminate, or change frequently due to COVID-19 pandemic-related restrictions.

Passenger

Cargo

Ground transportation

Intraterminal transportation 
Terminal 3 consists of three sub-concourses. Both domestic and international travellers check in at concourse T3C. Gates for domestic flights are in T3C, and gates for domestic flights operated by Air China are also located in concourse T3D. All international, Hong Kong, and Macau, and Taiwan flights are handled in concourse T3E.

In conjunction with the construction of the new terminal, Bombardier Transportation installed a  automated people mover which connects T3C and T3E via T3D in a 2–5-minute one-way trip.

New Innovia APM 300 vehicles is being delivered to Beijing Capital International Airport Terminal 3 People Mover in July 2021.

Interterminal transportation 

The airport provides a free interterminal shuttle bus between Terminals 1/2 and 3. They operate every 10 minutes from 6 am to 11 pm, and every 30 minutes from 11 pm until 6 am. Terminals 1 and 2 are connected by a lengthy corridor.

Rail

Beijing Capital International Airport is served by the Capital Airport Express, a dedicated rail link operated as part of the Beijing Subway system. The  line runs from Terminal 3 to Terminal 2 and then to the city with stops at Sanyuanqiao and Dongzhimen before ending at Beixinqiao. The line opened on 19 July 2008, in time for the 2008 Summer Olympics, while a one-stop extension to Beixinqiao station was opened on 31 December 2021. A one-way trip takes approximately 16–20 minutes and costs ¥25. The running hours are 6:35-23:10 for T2, 6:20-22:50 for T3 and 6:00-22:30 for Dongzhimen.

Bus

There are 18 bus routes to and from points throughout the city including Xidan, Beijing railway station, Beijing South railway station, Beijing West railway station, Zhongguancun, Fangzhuang and Shangdi. The airport buses run to each of the three terminals and cost up to ¥30 per ride depending on the route. The airport buses accept only paper tickets that are sold at each terminal and certain bus stops in the city. The airport also offers intercity bus services to and from neighboring cities including Tianjin, Qinhuangdao, Baoding, Langfang and Tangshan.

Car

The airport is accessible by four expresses tollways, two of which run directly from northeastern Beijing to the airport. The other two connect to the airport from nearby highways.

The Airport Expressway is a  toll road that runs from the northeastern 3rd Ring Road at Sanyuanqiao directly to Terminals 1 and 2. It was built in the 1990s and has served as the primary road connection to the city.
The 2nd Airport Expressway, opened in 2008, is a  toll road that runs east from Yaojiayuan Lu at the eastern 5th Ring Road and then north to Terminal 3.
The Northern Airport Line, opened in 2006, is an  toll road that runs east from the Jingcheng Expressway to Terminals 1 and 2.
The Southern Airport Line, opened in 2008, is a toll road that runs parallel and to the south of the Northern Airport Line from the Jingcheng Expressway to the eastern Sixth Ring Road at the Litian Bridge. This highway crosses the Airport Expressway and 2nd Airport Expressway, and enables drivers on the former to reach Terminal 3 and the latter to head to Terminals 1 and 2.

Accolades

 2009 – first on the ranking of the World's Best Airport by Condé Nast Traveler magazine, based on its satisfaction survey.
 2011 – third Best Airport Worldwide of the Airport Service Quality Awards by Airports Council International.
 2011–2022 – ACI Director General’s Roll of Excellence by Airports Council International
 2020, 2021 – best airport in the Asia-Pacific serving over 40 million passengers per year by Airports Council International
 2021 – best hygiene measures in the Asia-Pacific by Airports Council International
 2021 – Voice of the Customer by Airports Council International

Statistics

Other facilities
Beijing Capital Airlines has its headquarters in the Capital Airlines Building at the airport.

Sister airports
O'Hare International Airport
Helsinki Airport
Hong Kong International Airport
Los Angeles International Airport
Manchester Airport
Munich Airport
Suvarnabhumi Airport
Sydney Airport
Stockholm Arlanda Airport
Abu Dhabi International Airport

Photo gallery

See also

 Beijing Daxing International Airport
 Beijing Nanyuan Airport
 List of airports in China
 List of the busiest airports in China

References

External links

Official website
 Beijing Capital International Airport aviation weather 

Airports in Beijing
Airports established in 1958
1958 establishments in China
Buildings and structures in Chaoyang District, Beijing
High-tech architecture
Foster and Partners buildings
Enclaves in China
Shunyi District